The Hohe Veitsch (1,981 m) is the highest mountain in the Mürzsteg Alps, in the Austrian state of Styria.
It is a limestone massif, rich in wildflower meadows and good views, and runs from west (main summit) to east (plateau at about 1,500 metres) to the Klein-Veitsch Alm, a distances of around 5.5 km.

Ascent 

The best known tour on the Veitsch runs from Niederalpl up to the Sohlenalm, along the western side of the Wildkamm, then through a stone gully up to the high plateau. On the plateau, just below the summit, is the Graf Meran House owned by the Austrian Tourist Club (ÖTK).
Seen from the south, from (Mitterdorf / Brunnalm, in the parish of Veitsch), the Hohe Veitsch looks like a mighty limestone massif with steep south faces. The Graf Meran House is reached over the Goaß ascent (Goaß-Steign, about 2½ hours) or along the Serpentine Way (Serpentinenweg) left of the so-called 'Hundsschupfen' (around an hour).
The north-south long distance path no. 05 runs from Niederalpl to the summit, where it meets North Alpine Way 01 (Nordalpenweg 01) running from the east over the high plateau; then both paths continue in parallel to each other in a westerly direction via Turnauer Alm and Göriacher Alm to the Styrian Seeberg. The Styrian Mariazell Way also runs over the massif.

Plateau walk 
There is also a plateau walk via Seeboden to the Kleinveitschalm.

External links 

Mürzsteg Alps
Mountains of the Alps
Mountains of Styria
One-thousanders of Austria